George David Silva (1884 – 10 June 1912) was an Australian mass murderer. Silva, who was of Sinhalese descent, worked as a farmhand on a property owned by Hong-Kong born Charles Ching at Alligator Creek, about 20 miles (32 km) from Mackay, Queensland.

Early life 
George Silva was born to Sri Lankan parents and lived on the outskirts of the town of Mackay. He became a passionate attendant of the local church and often led prayers. He became known as a preacher and a "pet" of the church. As an adult, Silva found work as a farmhand on a property at Alligator Creek, 20 miles out of town.

Silva's employer was a property owner named Charlie Ching. Ching was a man from Hong Kong who'd married a white woman named Agnes. They lived in a corrugated iron home with a dirt floor. The kitchen was in a separate structure, away from the main home. However, in comparison to Silva, who had almost nothing, they were wealthy.

Silva wanted to marry the Ching family's oldest daughter, 17-year-old Maude Ching. Silva told a neighbour that he would get a plot of land from Charlie Ching by Christmas and he would build a home to start a family. The neighbor replied "You can't marry. You got no money. You got no blanket. No decent trousers. How would a girl like to marry you like that?"

Silva's marriage proposal was rejected by the Chings as he had nothing to offer their daughter. Maude also rejected his advances.

Murders, trial, and execution 
On 16 November 1911, Charles Ching told Silva he was traveling to town for supplies and money for Silva's wages. While he was away, Silva murdered the six Chings. The bodies of Agnes, Maud, Hugh and Winnie were found inside the house piled under a rug. Mother and eldest daughter had been shot by a revolver and a muzzle-loading rifle, while the boy and baby had their skulls smashed against the wall. The bodies of Teddy and Dolly Ching were found a mile and a half away; both had been shot and their skulls smashed in.

Police and aboriginal trackers inspected the crime scene, and after the trackers stated that there was no trail to follow the police homed in on Silva. Silva, fearing a lynch mob from Mackay, eventually confessed to police. He claimed that two neighbours had helped him murder the family, but the police found no evidence of him having any accomplices.

Tried only for killing Maud Ching, Silva admitted to being present, but denied personally killing anyone. It took the jury only 20 minutes to find him guilty of murder. Silva was given a mandatory death sentence and hanged at Boggo Road Gaol in Brisbane on 10 June 1912. He was buried in South Brisbane Cemetery. In his final moments, Silva repeatedly quoted passages from the Bible in an attempt to delay his execution until prison authorities told him to stop. Silva tried to keep talking as the noose was slipped around his neck, but was hanged before he could finish.

Victims

Agnes Ching, wife of Charles Ching
Maud Ching, 17, daughter of Charles Ching
Teddy Ching, 10, son of Charles Ching
Dolly Ching, 8, daughter of Charles Ching
Hugh Ching, 4, son of Charles Ching
Winnie Ching, 20 months, daughter of Charles Ching

Notes

References

External links
 Tragedy at Mackay, The Sydney Mail (22 November 1911)
 A terrible tragedy, Northern Territory Times and Gazette (15 December 1911)
 Fearful tragedy, Poverty Bay Herald (20 November 1911)
 Queensland murder case, Poverty Bay Herald (21 November 1911)
 The Ching tragedy, Poverty Bay Herald (20 November 1911)
 The Ching tragedy, Poverty Bay Herald (30 November 1911)

1884 births
1912 deaths
Australian mass murderers
Australian murderers of children
Australian people convicted of murder
Executed Australian people
Executed mass murderers
People executed by Australia by hanging
People executed by Queensland
Massacres in Australia
Massacres in 1912
People convicted of murder by Queensland
20th-century executions by Australia
Burials in South Brisbane Cemetery
Australian people of Sri Lankan descent